Taibuga, the first  Khan of the Khanate of Sibir, came to power in the 15th century as a result of the power vacuum caused by the breakup of the Mongol Empire. Some legendary accounts identify him as a noble from Bukhara and associate him with the conversion of Sibir to Islam.

The facts of his reign remain relatively unclear, but it appears he was a shamanist. Taibuga is said to have driven the forces of Novgorod from his land. He is also at times spoken of as the ancestor not just of the Khans but of the whole ruling elite of Sibir.

References

Khans
Khanate of Sibir
Year of death unknown
Year of birth unknown